The X-Files Mythology – Volume 4 collection is the fourth DVD release containing selected episodes from the eighth to the ninth seasons of the American science fiction television series The X-Files. The episodes collected in the release form the end of the series' mythology, and are centered on those that involve the alien "Super Soldiers" and Dana Scully's (Gillian Anderson) son, William.

The collection contains seven episodes from the eighth season and seven from the ninth. The episodes follow the investigations of paranormal-related cases, or X-Files, by Federal Bureau of Investigation (FBI) special agents Dana Scully (Gillian Anderson) and John Doggett (Robert Patrick), following Scully's former partner Fox Mulder's (David Duchovny) abduction by aliens. The two are assisted by Assistant Director Walter Skinner (Mitch Pileggi) and Agent Monica Reyes (Annabeth Gish). Events covered in the episodes include: the return, death, and resurrection of Mulder; the birth of Scully's child, William; the discovery of the "Super Soldier" conspiracy; the discovery of the remains of a space ship in Canada; Scully's choice to give William up for adoption; and Mulder's trial, conviction, escape, and discovery of the truth.

The collection contains the final episodes in the series' mythology, or fictional overarching story. The release features the closure of most of the series' long-running arcs. Production for the episodes was drastically affected after co-star Duchovny left the show. Released on  November 22, 2005, the collection received mixed to negative reviews from critics. Adam Baldwin, Chris Owens, Nicholas Lea, Laurie Holden, and William B. Davis all play supporting roles in the collection.

Plot summary
When Dana Scully (Gillian Anderson) learns that several women have reportedly been abducted and impregnated with alien babies, she begins to question her own pregnancy. John Doggett (Robert Patrick) introduces Scully to Monica Reyes (Annabeth Gish), an FBI specialist in ritualistic crime, shortly before Fox Mulder's (David Duchovny) deceased body suddenly appears in a forest at night. Following Mulder's funeral, Assistant Director Walter Skinner (Mitch Pileggi) is threatened by Alex Krycek (Nicholas Lea) that he must kill Scully's baby before it is born. Billy Miles, a multiple abductee who disappeared on the same night as Mulder, is returned deceased but his dead body is resurrected and restored to full health. Mulder also returns from death, with Scully supervising his recovery. Fully rejuvenated, Mulder investigates several X-Files, against orders to do so, but soon gets fired, leaving Doggett in charge of the cases. Mulder continues to provide input in an unofficial capacity.

Reluctantly accepting Krycek's assistance, Mulder, Doggett and Skinner learn that an alien virus recently created in secret by members of the United States government have replaced several humans, including Miles and several high-ranking FBI personnel, with so-called alien "Super Soldiers". Krycek claims that the soldiers are virtually unstoppable aliens who want to make sure that humans will not survive the colonization of Earth. They have learned that Scully's baby is a miraculously special child and are afraid that it may be greater than them. When Miles arrives at the FBI Headquarters, Mulder, Doggett, Skinner and Krycek help Scully to escape along with Reyes who drives her to a remote farm. Shortly after Skinner kills Krycek, Scully delivers an apparently normal baby while the alien "Super Soldiers" surround her. Without explanation, the aliens leave the area as Mulder arrives. While Doggett and Reyes report to the FBI Headquarters, Mulder takes Scully and their newborn son, William, back to her apartment.

Mulder goes into hiding, Scully is again reassigned to the FBI Academy, and Reyes becomes Doggett's new FBI partner at the X-Files office. Doggett, Scully, and Reyes discover a conspiracy to place Chloramine in the nation's water, causing mutations and creating "Super Soldiers". This leads them to a clandestine laboratory where a secret experiment is taking place on board, with connections to Scully's child, William. The X-Files office's investigation is hampered by Deputy Director Alvin Kersh (James Pickens, Jr.) and Assistant Director Brad Follmer (Cary Elwes). Hopeful about reuniting with Mulder, a complete stranger, "Shadow Man" (Terry O'Quinn), offers his service to drive Mulder out of hiding. Scully takes the offer, but near gets herself and Mulder killed when it is revealed the man is a Super Soldier. Later on, Scully, Doggett and Reyes find evidence of a dangerous UFO cult which has found a spacecraft similar to one Scully studied in Africa two years ago. The cult kidnaps William, but is destroyed when the baby's crying activates the ship, killing everyone in the cult, sans William.

Doggett finds a strange disfigured man in the X-Files office. Initially, Doggett believes the man is Mulder, but he is revealed to Jeffrey Spender (Chris Owens), Mulder's half-brother. Spender sticks a needle into William, which the other agents believe to be a virus of some kind, but is later revealed to be a cure for William's powers. Mulder returns from hiding to only be discovered looking for classified information at an army base and, after allegedly killing an apparently indestructible "Super Soldier" Knowle Rohrer (Adam Baldwin), he is placed on trial to defend the X-Files and himself. But with the help of Kersh, Scully, Reyes, Doggett, Spender, Marita Covarrubias (Laurie Holden) and Gibson Praise (Jeff Gulka), Mulder breaks out. Mulder and Scully travel to New Mexico to find an old "wise man", who is later revealed to be The Smoking Man (William B. Davis), who tells them that the aliens will arrive in 2012. Doggett and Reyes aid Mulder and Scully in escaping the FBI, and the two are last seen together in a motel room facing an uncertain future.

Production

After settling his contract dispute with Fox, Duchovny quit full-time participation in the show after the seventh season. In order to explain Mulder's absence, Duchovny's character was abducted by aliens in the seventh season finale, "Requiem." After several rounds of contractual discussions, Duchovny agreed to return for a total of 11 eighth season episodes. Thus, "Per Manum" marked the return of Duchovny as Mulder, although he had appeared briefly in flashback appearances and small cameos. Series creator Chris Carter later argued that Mulder's absences from the series did not affect the characterization, noting that "there are characters who can be powerful as absent centers, as Mulder was through the eight and ninth seasons."

After the end of the eighth season, Duchovny announced that he would leave the show for good. In addition, lead actress Anderson's contract also expired at the end of the eighth season. Anderson had expressed her growing disinterest in the series ever since the beginning of the eighth season, saying "For a lot of people, if you don't like your job, you can quit your job, I don't necessarily have that option." Anderson cited the fact that "eight years is a long time" as a contributing factor to her indifference. However, Carter soon changed his position and announced he would remain on the show and continue only if Anderson agreed to do another season. Eventually, Fox offered Anderson a "generous" incentive to stay, resulting in the retention of Carter and Anderson and a final season of the show. With the departure of Duchovny and limited use of Anderson, the show garnered much criticism by fans and critics alike, saying the bond between Mulder and Scully was what actually kept the show together for the first seven seasons of the show.

Going into the ninth season, the producers decided to drastically change the show. The style of the opening credits in "Nothing Important Happened Today" were changed from the original credits, which, more or less, had been the same for the previous eight seasons. The credits included new graphics as well as new cards for Gish and Pileggi. The finale episode of the series, "The Truth", was written by series creator Carter; he later noted, "It's the end—you don't get another chance. So you'd better put everything you've ever wanted to put in into the episode. There were things to distract us from what was really going on. The band was breaking up." He expounded on the idea, saying, "Frank [Spotnitz] and I [decided] it was probably time to go […] it was strange to be writing these things knowing it was the last time we'd see Scully doing certain things or hear Mulder saying certain things." Spotnitz explained, "What was kind of nice that Chris made the announcement in January is that we had times to wrap our minds around the end and plan for it and give all of the characters their due." Gish later said, "I have a great respect for the elegant in which they're closing the curtain". Bruce Harwood called the finale the "passing of a generation".

Reception
The collection, as well as the episodes themselves, received mixed to negative reviews from critics. Monica Kuebler of Exclaim! gave the collection a rather negative review and noted that it closed on a "lacklustre note". Furthermore, she wrote that the main issue with the release was that "the hardcore fans [of the series] had come to see The X-Files as Mulder and Scully and understandably weren't quick to swallow a couple of new characters running the department." Ultimately, she concluded that the poor episodes and the lack of bonus features included with the collection were proof that "Fox seems eager to wash their hands of the disappointing demise of the show".

Sabadino Parker from PopMatters wrote negatively about the mythology of the last two seasons, noting that "story itself became even more convoluted" and that "the past two seasons should never have happened." Entertainment Weekly reviewer Ken Tucker speculated that Chris Carter was the only one who seemed to understand the show's complex mytharc. Joyce Millman from The New York Times called the storyline involving Scully's child—which left her "haunted and irritable"—"a sad misuse of the radiant Anderson". The A.V. Club was highly critical of the final season and its mythology story, calling them a "clumsy mish-mash of stuff that had once worked and new serialized storylines about so-called 'super soldiers'".

Episodes

Special features

Notes 
A. In some regions, the last episode, "The Truth" is split up into two episodes, and not one.

References

Footnotes

Bibliography

External links

Mythology, Volume 4 - Super Soldiers
Television videos and DVDs